The Alchichica silverside (Poblana alchichica) is a species of neotropical silverside endemic to Lake Alchichica in Mexico.

Poblana achichica measures up to 10 in. (25 cm). According to a 2001 book, information on its breeding habits are not widely known and its primary food source is small aquatic invertebrates. The threats to Poblana achichica are largemouth bass and the habitat destruction from people.

This species was described by Don Fernando de Buen y Lozano in 1945 from a type locality of Lake Alchichica.

References

alchichica
Endemic fish of Mexico
Freshwater fish of Mexico
Fish described in 1945
Critically endangered animals
Oriental Basin